Molly O'Day (born Suzanne Dobson Noonan; October 16, 1909 – October 22, 1998) was an American film actress and the younger sister of Sally O'Neil.

Biography 
Born in Bayonne, New Jersey, she was the youngest of 11 children of Judge Thomas Francis Patrick Noonan and his wife, Hannah Kelly, a  Metropolitan Opera singer. After their father's death, O'Day and her two sisters moved to Hollywood. Besides O'Neil, another sister, Isabelle, also acted in films.

O'Day's first appearance was in the Laurel and Hardy short 45 Minutes from Hollywood in 1926.  She also appeared in Hal Roach's Our Gang series.

Only 16, she defeated 2,000 contenders in an audition for the tough girl heroine in the 1927 prizefighter movie The Patent Leather Kid.

Like O'Neil in 1926, O'Day became one of the WAMPAS Baby Stars in 1928. Also in 1928, she had surgery to "remove several pounds of flesh from her hips and legs." An Associated Press news story reported: "The actress has been gaining weight steadily for the last year and although under contract to a film studio has been idle. Her excessive weight was the cause of her lack of work, Miss O'Day said, and after other flesh reducing methods failed she decided on the surgeon's knife as the final resort."

After appearing in a few dozen films in the 1930s she retired.

Personal life and death  
O'Day married actor Jack Durant in 1934 in Tijuana, Baja California, Mexico. They divorced July 10, 1951, in Los Angeles, California. They had 4 children together.

O'Day died in Avila Beach, California, one day before her 89th birthday.

Recognition

O'Day has a star at 1708 Vine Street in the Motion Pictures category on the Hollywood Walk of Fame. It was dedicated February 8, 1960.

Filmography

References

External links 

Hollywood Walk of Fame webpage
Obituary in the L.A. Times
Molly O'Day at Virtual History

1909 births
1998 deaths
20th-century American actresses
Actresses from New Jersey
American film actresses
American silent film actresses
Actors from Bayonne, New Jersey
WAMPAS Baby Stars